The men's discus throw at the 2012 European Athletics Championships was held at the Helsinki Olympic Stadium on 29 and 30 June.

Medalists

Records

Schedule

Results

Qualification
Qualification: Qualification Performance 66.00 (Q) or at least 12 best performers advance to the final

Final

References

Qualification Results
Final Results
Full results

Discus Throw
Discus throw at the European Athletics Championships